Víctor Leopoldo Valencia de los Santos (6 April 1959 – 8 November 2020) was a Mexican politician affiliated with the Institutional Revolutionary Party (PRI).

Biography
Between 2006 and 2008 he served as a deputy in the LX Legislature of the Mexican Congress representing the fourth district of Chihuahua.

Valencia de los Santos died on 8 November 2020, from COVID-19.

References

1959 births
2020 deaths
People from Ciudad Juárez
Institutional Revolutionary Party politicians
21st-century Mexican politicians
Deaths from the COVID-19 pandemic in Mexico
Politicians from Chihuahua (state)
Autonomous University of Chihuahua alumni
University of New Mexico alumni
Members of the Congress of Chihuahua
20th-century Mexican politicians
Members of the Chamber of Deputies (Mexico) for Chihuahua (state)